Surnadal Idrettslag is a Norwegian sports club from Surnadal. It has sections for association football, team handball, alpine skiing and Nordic skiing.

General history
It was founded on 13 April 1913 as IL Framtid. The name Surnadal IL was taken in 1966, when IL Framtid was merged with IL Bjørn (founded 1932) and Surnadal JIL (founded 1945).

Skiing
Members of the skiing department include Sturla Brørs and Sigurd Brørs.

Football
The men's football team currently plays in the Fourth Division, the fifth tier of Norwegian football. Syltøran stadion is their home field. Their team colors are blue and white.

Players and staff

Current squad 
Updated 15 February 2017

                                                                              

Recent history, men's football team

References

 Official site 

Football clubs in Norway
Sport in Møre og Romsdal
Association football clubs established in 1913
Athletics clubs in Norway
1913 establishments in Norway